Wesley Verhoek (born 25 September 1986) is a Dutch former professional footballer. He was known as a striker who can also play as a winger on either side of the pitch.

He spent most of his professional career at ADO Den Haag at different positions in attack. His younger brother John is also a professional footballer and Wesley played alongside his brother in the last four months of his ADO career, when the latter was loaned out by Stade Rennes to the Hague football club. After 8 years at ADO, Verhoek transferred to FC Twente in the 2012 winter transfer window, but was traded 7 months later to Feyenoord for Jerson Cabral, who went in the opposite direction.

Career

ADO Den Haag
Born in Leidschendam, Verhoek's career began when he signed a professional contract with ADO Den Haag, after the winter break in 2004–05 he played his first match in the first team of ADO Den Haag. Verhoek also played for the Dutch youth squad. In August 2011, ADO Den Haag and Nottingham Forest had agreed a fee reported to be £2.5 million for Verhoek to join Forest; however Verhoek he pulled out of the deal, reportedly due to home sickness. Verhoek denied this was the case.

Twente
At the end of the transfer window in January 2012, Verhoek left ADO Den Haag to sign for FC Twente until July 2014. His time at Twente was not a big success, so he moved to Feyenoord on 31 August 2012.

Feyenoord
Verhoek joined Feyenoord from Twente on the last day of the 2012 summer transfer window. As part of the deal Jerson Cabral moved to FC Twente.

Go Ahead Eagles
Early 2015, during the January transfer window, Verhoek agreed to a loan move and joined Go Ahead Eagles for the rest of the season.

Pune City and Delft
In September 2015, Verhoek joined Indian Super League side FC Pune City.

In October 2017, after returning to the Netherlands he joined amateur side DHC Delft.

Personal life
Following his retirement as a player Verhoek had a fruit and vegetables shop.

Career statistics

References

External links
 Voetbal International profile 

1986 births
Living people
People from Leidschendam
Dutch footballers
Association football forwards
ADO Den Haag players
FC Twente players
Feyenoord players
Go Ahead Eagles players
FC Pune City players
Eredivisie players
Eerste Divisie players
Indian Super League players
Expatriate footballers in India
Footballers from South Holland